Calliotectum is a genus of sea snails, marine gastropod mollusks in the family Volutidae.

The genus was first described by William Healey Dall in 1890.

Description
The shell shows a dark vernicose periostracum. There is no differentiated siphonal canal, anal sulcus or fasciole. The shell is axially ribbed. The columella is thin and twisted. The axis is impervious. The outer lip is simple, arcuate, thin, not internally lirate. The operculum is like that of Fusinus, but arcuate. The  animal is blind, without radula or poison gland. Type species:  Calliotectum vernicosum Dall, 1890.

Distribution 
Species of the genus are found off Taiwan, in the East China Sea, Vanuatu, Indonesia, Loyalty Islands, New Caledonia, Philippines, Eastern Pacific, Galapagos Islands, Lubang Island, Wallis and Futuna, Kermadec Islands, Chesterfield Isles, East China Sea, Indonesia, in the  Arafura Sea, and off the northern and western coasts of Australia.

Species
Species within the genus Calliotectum include:

 Calliotectum dalli (Bartsch, 1942)
 Calliotectum egregium Bouchet & Poppe, 1995
 Calliotectum mirabile (Clench & Aguayo, 1941)
 Calliotectum piersonorum Bouchet & Poppe, 1995
 Calliotectum smithi (Bartsch, 1942)
 Calliotectum tibiaeforme (Kuroda, 1931)
 Calliotectum vernicosum Dall, 1890

References

 Bail P. & Poppe G.T. 2001. A conchological iconography: a taxonomic introduction of the recent Volutidae. ConchBooks, Hackenheim. 30 pp, 5 pl.

External links
 Finlay H.J. (1926). A further commentary on New Zealand molluscan systematics. Transactions of the New Zealand Institute. 57: 320-485, pls 18-23

Volutidae
Taxa named by William Healey Dall
Taxa described in 1890